Route 264 is a north-south regional highway in southern Israel. It connects Highway 25 at HaNasi junction with Highway 40 at Kama junction. It is 14.5 km long.

Junctions on the route

See also
List of highways in Israel

264